was a town located in Kami District, Kōchi Prefecture, Japan.

As of 2003, the town had an estimated population of 22,160 and a density of 190.28 persons per km2. The total area was 116.46 km2.

On March 1, 2006, Tosayamada, along with the town of Kahoku, and the village of Monobe (all from Kami District), was merged to create the city of Kami and no longer exists as an independent municipality. However it is still considered a town by residents and is still used in official addresses with the post office.

Tosayamada has a sister city relationship with Largo, Florida. Yamada Senior High School and Largo High School (Florida) have an ongoing yearly exchange program.

Tosa-Yamada Station is the town's train station.

Schools
 Kochi University of Technology
 Yamada Senior High School
 Kagamino Junior High School

People from Tosayamada
 Taira Hara, manga artist
Yumiko Kurahashi, writer and translator

External links
 Official website of Kami 
 Kochi University of Technology in Tosayamada
 Yamada High School Homepage

Dissolved municipalities of Kōchi Prefecture
Kami, Kōchi